The 2022–23 Union Dutchmen ice hockey season was the 82nd season of play for the program and the 31st in the ECAC Hockey conference. The Dutchmen represented Union College, played their home games at Achilles Center and were coached by Josh Hauge, in his first season.

Season
After John Ronan finished the previous years as interim head coach due to the resignation of Rick Bennett, Union began a search for a permanent replacement. In mid-April, the team chose former Clarkson assistant Josh Hauge as the 22nd head coach in program history. John Ronan returned to his former post as an assistant while the rest of the staff was filled by new entries.

Departures

Recruiting

Roster
As of August 4, 2022.

|}

Standings

Schedule and results

|-
!colspan=12 style=";" | Regular Season

|-
!colspan=12 style=";" |

Scoring statistics

Goaltending statistics

Rankings

Note: USCHO did not release a poll in weeks 1, 13, or 26.

References

2022-23
Union Dutchmen
Union Dutchmen
Union Dutchmen
Union Dutchmen